The 1989 World Table Tennis Championships women's doubles was the 39th edition of the women's doubles championship.
Qiao Hong and Deng Yaping defeated Chen Jing and Hu Xiaoxin in the final by two sets to nil.

Results

See also
List of World Table Tennis Championships medalists

References

-
World